Volvo Buses (Volvo Bus Corporation / formal name: Volvo Bussar AB) (stylized as VOLVO) is a subsidiary and a business area of the Swedish vehicle maker Volvo, which became an independent division in 1968. It is based in Gothenburg.

It is one of the world's largest bus manufacturers, with a complete range of heavy buses for passenger transportation. The product range includes complete buses and coaches as well as chassis combined with a comprehensive range of services.

The bus operation has a global presence, with production in Europe, North and South America, Asia and Australia. In India it set up its production facility in Bangalore. A former production facility was located in Irvine, Scotland (closed in 2000).

Products

Chassis
Codes in parentheses are VIN codes for the chassis models.

Historical
1930s/40s: B10, B12
1950s: B627
1950s–1960s: B615/B616/B617
1950s–1960s: B635/B638
1950s–1960s: B705
1950s–1960s: B725/B727
1951–1963: B655 (mid-engine)/B656/B657/B658
1960s: B715
1963–1965: B755
1960s–1980s: B57 & BB57
1965–1982: B58
1966–1971: B54
1970–1980: B59
1973–1985: Ailsa B55
1978–2001: B10M/B10MA/B10MD (1M) – the double deck city bus version B10MD, built from 1982 to 1993, was also known as Citybus
1983–1996? B9M (9M) – low-budget version of the B10M
1988–1991 B10C (1C) – special Australian coach version of the B10M
1978–1991: B10R (1R)
1978–1987?: B6F/B6FA (6A)
198?–198?: B6M (6M) – for Asia Pacific
1990–2002: B10B (R1)
1991–2011: B12 (R2) – known as B12R, later B380R/B420R in Brazil
1991–1998: B6/B6LE (R3)
1992–2000: Olympian (YN) – modified from Leyland Olympian
1992–2004: B10BLE (R4)
1993-2000s: B10L/B10LA (R5)
1997–2006?: B7L/B7LA (R7)
1998–2002: B6BLE (R3)
1997–2011: B12B (R8)
2001–2011: B12BLE/B12BLEA (R8) – articulated version was introduced in 2005
1998–2004: Super Olympian (S1) – also known as B10TL
1999–2006: B7TL (S2)
2000–2003: B10R (S3) – for Brazil
2002–2018: B9TL (S4) – low-floor double-decker, once known as Olympian in Volvo official website
2010?–2013: B9RLE (S5)
2012–2021: B5TL (T9) – low-floor double-decker

Current
1997–: B7R (R6) – known as B290R in Brazil since 2011
2001–: B7RLE (R6) – low-entry version of the B7R
1999–: B12M/B12MA (R9) – known as B340M in Brazil since 2011 (bi-articulated version was introduced in 2002)
2003–: B9R (S5) – known as B340R/B380R in Brazil 2011–2012
2002–: B9S (S6) – bi-articulated version was introduced in 2006, known as B360S in Brazil since 2011
2005–: B9L/B9LA (S7) – low-floor
2008–: B5LH (T1) – low-floor hybrid-electric bus
2009–: BXXR (T2)
2009–: B13R – 12.8-litre engine
2011–: B11R – 10.8-litre engine, known as B340R/B380R/B420R/B450R in Brazil
2011–: B270F (T5) – front-engined
2012–: B5RH/B5RLEH (T8) – step-entrance/low-entry hybrid-electric bus, known as B215RH/B215LH in Brazil 
2013–: B8R (T7)
2013–: B8RLE/B8RLEA (T7) – low-entry version of the B8R
2015–: BE (U1)
2016–: B8L (U2) – low-floor double-decker
2021–: BZL – low-floor single/double-decker

Complete buses

 C10M (built in 1980s)
 5000/7500 low-floor citybus (B10L/B7L/B9S Articulated chassis)
 7000/7700 low-floor citybus (B10L/B7L/B9L chassis)
 7250/7350 coach (Volvo/Drögmöller B10-400/B7R chassis) – for Mexico
 7400 – for India
 7400XL – for India
 7450/7550 coach
 7700A articulated low-floor citybus (B7LA/B9LA chassis)
 7700 Hybrid low-floor citybus (B5LH chassis)
 7800 articulated BRT bus (B9S Articulated chassis) – for China
 7900 low-floor citybus
 7900 Hybrid low-floor citybus (B5LH chassis)
 7900A Hybrid articulated low-floor citybus (B5LAH chassis)
 8300 intercity (B9R chassis) – for Mexico
 8400 citybus (B7RLE chassis) – for India
 8500 TX intercity (B7R/B12M chassis)
 8500A articulated intercity (B12MA chassis)
 8500LE citybus (B10BLE/B7RLE/B12BLE/B9S Articulated chassis)
 8600 (B8R chassis) – for Europe, built in India
 8700 TX intercity (B7R/B12B/B12M chassis)
 8700LE citybus (B7RLE/B12BLE chassis)
 8700LEA articulated citybus (B12BLEA chassis)
 8900 intercity (B7R/B9R/B8R chassis)
 8900LE citybus (B7RLE/B9RLE/B8RLE chassis)
 9100 coach – for Asia, built in India
 9300 coach (B9R chassis) – for Mexico
 9400 intercity (B7R/B8R/B9R chassis) – for India
 9400XL(6X2) intercity (B9R chassis) – for India
 9400PX coach (B11R chassis) – for India
 9500 coach (B9R/B8R chassis)
 9600 coach (B9R chassis) – for China
 9700 TX intercity/coach (B12B/B12M/B7R/B9R/B13R/B11R/B8R chassis)
 9800 coach (B12M chassis) – for China
 9800 coach (B13R chassis) – for Mexico
 9800 Double Decker coach (B13R chassis) – for Mexico
 9900 coach (B12B/B13R/B11R chassis)

Acquired companies
Bus makers owned/acquired by Volvo:
 Säffle Karosseri AB, Säffle, Sweden (1981, known as Volvo Bussar Säffle AB from 2004, plant closed in 2013)
 Leyland Bus, United Kingdom (1988, all Leyland products ceased production by July 1993)
 Steyr Bus GmbH, Steyr, Austria (75% in 1990, plant closed in the 1990s)
 Aabenraa Karrosseri A/S, Aabenraa, Denmark (1994, plant closed in 2004)
 Drögmöller Karosserien GmbH & Co. KG, Heilbronn, Germany (1994, later known as Volvo Busse Industries (Deutschland) GmbH, plant closed in 2005)
 Prevost Coaches, Quebec, Canada (1995), now known as Prevost Car
 Merkavim, Israel (1996), jointly owned by Volvo Bus Corporation & Mayer Cars & Trucks Ltd., importer of HONDA cars & bikes in Israel
 Volvo Polska Sp. z o.o., Wrocław, Poland (1996), the largest Volvo Buses factory in Europe
 Carrus Oy, Finland (January 1998, known as Volvo Bus Finland Oy from 2004)
 Carrus Oy Delta, Lieto, known as Volvo Bus Finland Oy Turku Factory from 2004, became independent in 2008 and renamed Carrus Delta Oy
 Carrus Oy Ajokki, Tampere, known as Volvo Bus Finland Oy Tampere Factory from 2004, plant closed in 2008
 Carrus Oy Wiima, Vantaa, plant closed in 2001
 Nova Bus, St-Eustache, Quebec, Canada (1998)
 Mexicana de Autobuses SA (MASA), Tultitlán, Mexico (1998), renamed Volvo Buses de México
 Alfa Busz Kft, Székesfehérvár, Hungary, (2002)
 EUROBUS, Zagreb, Croatia (1994.-1999.) on chassis B10, B12

Production sites
 Borås, Sweden
 Hoskote, Bangalore, India
 Curitiba, Brazil
 Wroclaw, Poland 
 Tultitlán, Mexico

Gallery

References

External links

Volvo Buses official website

Bus manufacturers of Sweden
Vehicle manufacturing companies established in 1968
Hybrid electric bus manufacturers
Trolleybus manufacturers
Swedish companies established in 1968